The 2004 United States Senate election in Pennsylvania was held on November 2, 2004. Incumbent Republican U.S. Senator Arlen Specter won re-election to a fifth term. As of 2022, this is the last time a Republican statewide candidate won Montgomery and Delaware Counties and won more than 25% of the vote in Philadelphia.

Democratic primary

Campaign 
Democrats had difficulty recruiting top tier candidates against the popular Specter. Among the Democrats to decline to run for the nomination were Treasurer (and former Republican) Barbara Hafer, Public Utilities Commissioner John Hanger, real estate mogul Howard Hanna, State Representative (and also former Republican) John Lawless, and State Senator (and future Congresswoman) Allyson Schwartz.

Congressman Hoeffel ended up running unopposed for the Democratic nomination. Software businessman Charlie Crystle was considered a strong possible candidate, but he dropped out before the election.

Results

Republican primary

Campaign 
Specter faced a primary challenge from Representative Pat Toomey. Despite the state Republican Party's strong history of embracing a moderate philosophy, the influence of conservatism among rank-and-file members had been steadily growing for decades; because of his liberal social views, Specter was often considered to be a "Republican in Name Only" by the right. Although Specter had a huge fundraising advantage, Toomey was aided by $2 million of advertising from the Club for Growth, a conservative political action committee that focuses on fiscal issues and targets moderate Republican incumbents.  Toomey criticized Specter as a spendthrift on economic policy and as out of touch with his own party on social issues. Although Toomey had difficulty with name recognition early in the campaign, he built huge momentum over the final weeks preceding the primary, and Specter appeared to have transitioned from having a comfortable lead to being behind his challenger.

Specter received a huge boost from the vocal support of President George W. Bush; most of the state's Republican establishment also closed ranks behind Specter. This included Pennsylvania's other U.S. Senator, Rick Santorum, who was noted for his social conservative views. Many Republicans at the state and national level feared that if Toomey beat Specter, he wouldn't be able to defend the seat against his Democratic opponent.

Polling

Results 

Source: PA Department of State - 2004 General Primary

General election

Candidates 
Major
 Joe Hoeffel (D), U.S. Representative
 Arlen Specter (R), incumbent U.S. Senator

Minor
 Jim Clymer (C)
 Betsy Summers (L)

Campaign 
For Democrats, hope of winning the election centered on Toomey's defeat of Specter. However, after the challenge from the right failed, enthusiasm from the party establishment waned and Hoeffel had difficulty matching the name recognition and fundraising power of his opponent    Despite contempt from conservatives, Specter enjoyed high levels of support from independent voters and, as in previous elections, a surprisingly large crossover from Democratic voters. Even in the areas in which Toomey performed best in the Republican primary (mainly the state's conservative, rural center), Specter performed well. Except for his large margin of victory in almost uniformly Democratic Philadelphia, Hoeffel was crushed at the polls; his only other wins came by close margins in three metro Pittsburgh counties; although President Bush proved to be unpopular in the state, voters were not willing to abandon Specter over party affiliation. Incidentally, Toomey was elected to the seat in 2010, after Specter switched to the Democratic Party in 2009 and subsequently lost renomination to U.S. Congressman and former Navy Admiral Joe Sestak.

Predictions

Polling

Results 

Source: Election Statistics - Office of the Clerk of the House of Representatives

See also 
 2004 United States Senate elections

Notes

References

External links 
Debates
 Pennsylvania Senate Republican Primary Election Debate on C-SPAN, April 3, 2004
 Pennsylvania Senate General Election Debate on C-SPAN, October 2, 2004
 Pennsylvania Senate General Election Debate on C-SPAN, October 9, 2004

Official campaign websites (archived)
Democrats
 Joe Hoeffel

Republicans
 Arlen Specter
 Pat Toomey

2004 Pennsylvania elections
Pennsylvania
2004